"Elaan of Troyius" is the thirteenth episode of the third season of the American science fiction television series Star Trek. Written and directed by John Meredyth Lucas, it was first broadcast on December 20, 1968.

In the episode, the Enterprise ferries a spoiled princess whose betrothal is hoped will bring peace to a star system at war.

Elaan of Troyius was written and directed by John Meredyth Lucas, the only person in Star Trek production history ever to both write and direct a filmed Star Trek television episode.

Plot
The Federation starship Enterprise arrives at the planet Elas to pick up Elaan, the Dohlman of Elas. Accompanying them is Ambassador Petri of Troyius, a planet with which Elas has been at war. As Petri explains, the Elasian Council of Nobles and the Troyius Tribunal have agreed to marry Elaan to the Troyian king to secure peace, lest the two planets destroy each other. Elaan is a most reluctant bride, cursing an arrangement that she considers a humiliation. Ambassador Petri's mission is to instruct Elaan in the manners and customs of the Troyians.

Not long after the Enterprise begins the return journey to Troyius at low impulse speed, a Klingon warship is detected, which paces the Enterprise and ignores all hails. To complicate matters further, Elaan stabs Petri, who refuses to have any further dealings with the Dohlman and vows that his ruler will never marry her. The job of teaching her falls to Captain Kirk.

In Sickbay, Nurse Chapel asks the ambassador why Elasian women are so prized in spite of their savagery. Petri explains that when the tears of an Elasian female touch a man's skin, his heart is "enslaved forever".

Elaan does not take kindly to Kirk's efforts to educate her and attempts to stab him. He overpowers her, disarms her, and insists that she will learn what she has been ordered to learn. Elaan locks herself in a bathroom and begins to cry, saying she is tired of being hated by everyone. Kirk tries to comfort her, and after wiping a tear from her cheek finds himself besotted with Elaan.

Meanwhile, one of the ship's engineers is killed by Kryton, Elaan's chief bodyguard, who then tampers with the Enterprises warp engines and tries to contact the Klingon battle cruiser. He is captured, but commits suicide before he can be interrogated. Kirk orders Chief Engineer Scott to check the ship's propulsion systems. Elaan reveals that Kryton was in love with her and had been infuriated by the news of the arranged marriage.

The Klingon battlecruiser then begins what appears to be an attack. As Kirk orders the Enterprise to go to warp, Scott reports that, as a result of Kryton's sabotage, any attempt to do so will destroy the ship. As the Klingon passes by without firing, it becomes clear that they were hoping to destroy the Enterprise without an overt act of war. This plan having failed, the Klingons attack in earnest. Mr. Scott reports that Kryton damaged the dilithium crystals in the antimatter reactor control system, making it impossible to go to warp or fire their weapons.

In Sickbay, Ambassador Petri again approaches Elaan and begs her to accept the necklace of Troyian royal jewels that was to be worn at her wedding, as a symbol of the hope for peace between their two worlds. Elaan accepts the necklace and subsequently appears on the bridge wearing it with her wedding dress. Spock detects strange energy readings from some of the jewels, which Elaan describes as common stones, valued only as good-luck charms. The stones are in fact dilithium crystals, which explains the Klingons' keen interest in this star system.

The crystals are taken to Scott in Engineering, where he and Spock work to replace the damaged dilithium crystals as the battlecruiser moves in for the kill. Power is restored to the Enterprise just before the Klingons’ final attack. After suffering serious damage from the Enterprise's photon torpedoes, the Klingon ship is successfully driven off.

A much changed Elaan is delivered safely to Troyius. Before she departs, Elaan gives Kirk her dagger as a memento, explaining she has learned that "on Troyius, they do not wear such things." She and Kirk say their farewells in the transporter room, with a heartbroken Elaan crying as she is beamed down. Later, McCoy appears on the bridge to report he has found an antidote to the Elasian tears, but it seems not to be needed after all. As Mr. Spock points out, "The Enterprise infected the Captain long before the Dohlman did."

Production and reception
Cut from the episode was a scene in the ship's recreation room, where Kirk, McCoy, Uhura and Spock meet and discuss how to calm Elaan. Uhura suggests using the sound of Spock's Vulcan harp to calm her; the music is later heard piped into Elaan's cabin.

This episode features the first appearance of the D-7 class Klingon battle cruiser designed and built by Star Trek art director Walter M. Jefferies. The footage of the Klingon battle cruiser was re-used in subsequent episodes of the third season.

France Nuyen is believed to be the first Vietnamese actor to appear on American television. She had previously starred with William Shatner on Broadway for two years in the title role of The World of Suzie Wong. She would later guest-star along with Shatner, as husband and wife, in the Kung Fu season 3 episode "A Small Beheading".

This is the last episode lit by cinematographer Gerald Finnerman who had been with the show since the first episode.

This episode is also the final appearance in the original series (as originally broadcast) of Eddie Paskey as Lt. Leslie.

This episode has the distinction of being the only episode of the series to have all seven principal characters in the final shot on the Enterprise bridge - Kirk, Spock, McCoy, Scotty, Uhura, Sulu and Chekov - along with an unidentified female Ensign.

The episode's title character pays tribute to Helen of Troy from Homer's Iliad, and its plot borrows from William Shakespeare's comedy, The Taming of the Shrew.

Trek Navigator Mark A. Altman gave the episode two stars stating "A thinly veiled version of The Taming of the Shrew, the episode is largely carried on the shoulders of William Shatner."

The A.V. Club Zack Handlen rates "Elaan of Troyius" as a B, making note of character development and the unexpected ending: "If you'd asked me to predict the rest of the episode after Elaan and Kirk hooked up, I would've guessed it would have something to do with Kirk interfering with the wedding ... [i]nstead, we get a nifty space battle against the Klingons, a traitor in the Elasians, an unexpected source of dilithium crystals, and a curiously muted performance from Shatner that does a good job at conveying his internal struggle between feeling and duty without overselling it."

Samuel Walters of [dauntlessmedia.net] rates the episode as a C−, citing a "scattershot approach to the plot" which "leaves too many possibilities unexplored and underdeveloped," and calling the entire episode "flat."

Releases 
This episode was released in Japan on December 21, 1993 as part of the complete season 3 LaserDisc set, Star Trek: Original Series log.3. A trailer for this and the other episodes was also included, and the episode had English and Japanese audio tracks. The cover script was スター・トレック TVサードシーズン 

This episode was included in TOS Season 3 remastered DVD box set, with the remastered version of this episode.

References

External links

"Elann of Troyius" Review of the remastered version at TrekMovie.com

Star Trek: The Original Series (season 3) episodes
1968 American television episodes
Cultural depictions of Helen of Troy
Television episodes directed by John Meredyth Lucas
Television episodes written by John Meredyth Lucas